George H. LeBlanc is the former mayor of Moncton, New Brunswick, Canada. He was elected in the Moncton municipal election of May 12, 2008. He was sworn into office on May 26, 2008. He was re-elected in 2012.

On January 27, 2015, Leblanc announced his candidacy for the federal Liberal nomination in Moncton—Riverview—Dieppe for the 2015 federal election. On March 28, LeBlanc was defeated for the nomination by Ginette Petitpas Taylor. On January 4, 2016, LeBlanc announced he would not re-offer in the 2016 municipal election.

References

Mayors of Moncton
Living people
Year of birth missing (living people)